Kuamasi (Songping Yi 松坪彝) is a recently discovered Loloish language of Heqing County, Yunnan, China. The Kuamasi are found in Matang 麻塘, Songping Village 松坪村, Liuhe Township 六合乡, Heqing County (Castro, et al. 2010). A Loloish language spoken in Daying Village 大营村, Songgui Town 松桂镇 is also likely closely related to Kuamasi (Castro 2010:23).

References

Loloish languages